The 1937 Chertsey by-election was held on 2 July 1937. The by-election was held due to the death of the incumbent Conservative MP, Archibald Boyd-Carpenter.

Candidates
The Liberal Party selected Ronald Haylor, a Buckingham Gate Barrister. He was educated at the Leys and Trinity College, Oxford. He played hockey for Oxford University and rugby union for a leading London club. He was Liberal Party candidate at Windsor in the 1929 general election and at Totnes for the general elections of 1931 and 1935. There were growing moves for a Popular Front, where parties of the left came together to oppose fascism and Nazi appeasement. In Chertsey, a local Popular Front was formed, which hoped to see the Liberal and Labour parties support a progressive candidate. They launched a charter in February 1937. Haylor was given the backing of the Chertsey Popular Front and added the suffix of 'Progressive' to the party label.

At first, a three-cornered contest had been expected between the Conservative candidate, the retired naval officer Arthur Marsden, Haylor and Mr F. J. Tompsett, a City rubber broker, who was to have stood as an Independent and anti-Communist. However, Tompsett decided to withdraw in favour of Marsden.

Result

References

1937 elections in the United Kingdom
1937 in England
20th century in Surrey
Borough of Runnymede
By-elections to the Parliament of the United Kingdom in Surrey constituencies